Amy Frazier (born September 19, 1972) is a former professional tennis player from the United States. She won eight singles and four doubles titles on the WTA Tour. On February 27, 1995 she achieved a career-high singles ranking of No. 13, while on March 29, 1993 she achieved a career-high doubles ranking of No. 24.

Biography

Active career
Frazier made her first appearance in four tour qualifying events in 1986 and debuted in the main draw in 1987, including at the 1987 US Open, where she lost to Catarina Lindqvist in the first round. She was an active player until the 2006 US Open, in which she made her 20th consecutive appearance (a record among active players). She also appeared in 18 Australian Open, 18 Wimbledon, and 15 French Open tournaments for an all-time record of 71 Grand Slam appearances, until compatriot Venus Williams surpassed this record at the 2016 US Open. She qualified two times for year end WTA Tour Championships, first time in 1992 and then in 2000.

Her best showing is a pair of quarterfinal appearances at the 1992 Australian Open and 1995 US Open. She lost 30 times in the first round of her Grand Slam matches, 18 times in the second round, 15 times in the third round, six times in the fourth round, and both of her quarterfinal matches. Her all-time Grand Slam record is 73–71. Frazier has more than 30 wins against top-10 players, spent 18 consecutive years in the top 100 and 17 straight seasons inside the Top 40 which is the longest ever continuous span by any male or female tennis player who hasn't reached top 10.

Frazier has the distinction of being the last woman to play against Steffi Graf in a WTA Tour match at the 1999 TIG Tennis Classic, played at the La Costa Resort and Spa outside San Diego. During the third set, Graf retired and never played again.

Frazier won eight career titles and was a finalist seven times. Being a flat-hitter, she excelled on hard courts and was the most successful on the summer hard-court events in California and appeared in eight finals in two different events in Japan.

She was also a member of the United States Fed Cup team.

Retirement
Frazier played her last professional tour match at the 2006 US Open. She never officially announced her retirement. After leaving the WTA Tour, she continued to be actively involved in tennis taking up a coaching role at the Franklin Athletic Club, Michigan (her local tennis club where she was first introduced to the sport at three years of age).

USTA National W40 Hardcourt champion
In December 2015, Frazier won the USTA National W40 Hardcourt Championships at La Jolla, California. At 43, it was her first and her last USTA National Senior tournament since leaving the pro tour.

USTA Midwest Hall of Fame induction
In 2018, she was inducted into the USTA Midwest Hall of Fame.

Personal life
Frazier is married and has a daughter.

WTA career finals

Singles: 15 (8–7)

Doubles: 13 (4–9)

Grand Slam performance timeline

Singles

Records against top ranked players
Frazier has had some success against top-ranked opponents. Her records against some of the top rated women are as follows:
 Mary Pierce             4–3
 Justine Henin           2–1
 Arantxa Sánchez Vicario 4–3
 Jennifer Capriati       0–6
 Jelena Jankovic         0-2
 Pam Shriver             4–1
 Lindsay Davenport       0–10
 Patty Schnyder          3–2
 Steffi Graf             1–6
 Gabriela Sabatini       2–3
 Anke Huber              6–2
 Martina Hingis          1–6
 Martina Navratilova     1–2
 Monica Seles            1–9
 Maria Sharapova         0–3
 Nicole Vaidišová        1–0
 Ai Sugiyama             4–1
 Serena Williams         0–3
 Venus Williams          0–5
 Marion Bartoli          1–2
 Daniela Hantuchová      1–2
 Conchita Martínez       4–8
 Tatiana Golovin         1–1
 Ana Ivanovic            1–1
 Dominique Monami        2-0
 Silvia Farina Elia      3-2
 Barbara Paulus          2-0
 Natasha Zvereva         2-2
 Barbara Schett          4-3
 Brenda Schultz-McCarthy 2-3
 Magdalena Maleeva       1:1
 Katerina Maleeva        3:3
 Manuela Maleeva         2:3
 Helena Sukova           0:3
 Jo Durie                0:1
 Kim Clijsters           0:2
 Anna Kournikova         0:2

References

External links
 
 

1972 births
American female tennis players
Hopman Cup competitors
Living people
Sportspeople from Detroit
Tennis people from Michigan
Tennis players from St. Louis
21st-century American women